Anjela Toma (born 11 August 1972) is a Moldovan former footballer who played as a midfielder. She has been a member of the Moldova women's national team.

International career
Toma capped for Moldova at senior level during the UEFA second categories of two FIFA Women's World Cup qualifiers (2003 and 2007).

References

1972 births
Living people
Women's association football midfielders
Moldovan women's footballers
Moldova women's international footballers